The Pothigai Express is an overnight Superfast train service operated between Chennai Egmore and Sengottai

Route 
The service traverses via Villupuram, Trichy, Madurai, Sivakasi, Rajapalayam and Sankarankovil on the Southern Railway zone of the Indian Railways.

Schedule 
The service numbered 12661 starts daily departing Chennai Egmore for Sengottai, and train number 12662 in the opposite direction.

Coach Composition
This train having 22 coaches

See also
Vaigai Superfast Express
Pandian Superfast Express
Kanniyakumari Superfast Express
Sethu Superfast Express
Pearl City (Muthunagar) Superfast Express
Rockfort (Malaikottai) Superfast Express
Pallavan Superfast Express
Nellai Superfast Express
Tiruchendur (Chendur) Express
Cholan Superfast Express

References

External links

Transport in Chennai
Named passenger trains of India
Rail transport in Tamil Nadu
Express trains in India